Burhan Railway Station (Urdu and ) is located in Burhan town, Attock district of Punjab province, Pakistan.

See also
 List of railway stations in Pakistan
 Pakistan Railways

References

Railway stations in Attock District